Luce Fabbri (pen name, Luz de Alba; 1908–2000) was an Italian anarchist writer, publisher and daughter of Luigi Fabbri.

Further reading

External links 

 Personal papers archived at the International Institute of Social History

1908 births
2000 deaths
Italian anarchists
Italian emigrants to Uruguay
Uruguayan anarchists
Spanish Revolution of 1936